Murai may refer to:
Murai (surname), Japanese surname
Murai, Singapore, area in Western Water Catchment
Murai Reservoir, Singapore reservoir
Murai Station, Japan railway station